Simple, Sweet, and Smiling is the third studio album by American singer-songwriter Kacy Hill. It was released independently on October 15, 2021. It was preceded by the singles "Seasons Bloom", and "Easy Going". The album was made primarily in collaboration with her partner Jim-E Stack, and John Carroll Kirby, collaborating also with Eli Teplin, Ariel Rechtshaid, Mk.gee, and Ethan Gruska.

Similarly to her previous 2020 record, Is It Selfish If We Talk About Me Again, the album documents Hill working through feelings of powerlessness and agoraphobic panic disorder, as well as acknowledging gratefulness towards her loved ones, and moments of clarity.

Hill embarked on her first headlining tour, the Simple, Sweet and Selfish Tour, in support of the album, as well as its predecessor.

In late February 2022, Hill unveiled a demo album available for consumption via the NFT-based music platform, Catalog.

Track listing

References 

2021 albums
Self-released albums